Mirrored is the debut studio album by American experimental rock band Battles. It was released on May 14, 2007 in the United Kingdom, and on May 22, 2007 in the United States. Mirrored marked the first album in which the band incorporated prominent vocals and lyrics into their songs, as previous extended plays by the band had been completely instrumental, with the exception of occasional beatboxing and wordless vocals on certain tracks. The first single from the album, "Atlas", was released in the United Kingdom on April 2, 2007. Mirrored was released to wide critical acclaim and appeared on year-end best album lists from several publications, including Time, NME, The Guardian, and Pitchfork Media.

Reception

Mirrored was widely acclaimed upon release. At Metacritic, which assigns a normalized rating out of 100 to reviews from mainstream critics, the album received an average score of 86, indicating "universal acclaim", based on 31 reviews. The album placed ninth in The Wires annual critics' poll. Online music magazine Pitchfork later placed Mirrored at number 105 on their list of top 200 albums of the 2000s. The single "Atlas" was ranked at number 42 on Pitchforks top 500 tracks of the 2000s list. In October 2011, NME placed "Atlas" at number 54 on its list "150 Best Tracks of the Past 15 Years".

Track listing

Personnel
Battles
 Dave Konopka – bass, guitar, effects
 John Stanier – drums
 Ian Williams – guitar, keyboards
 Tyondai Braxton – guitar, keyboards, vocals

Additional personnel
Mike Viele – assistant engineering
Seth Manchester – assistant engineering
Jeff Lipton – mastering
Jessica Thompson – mastering
Dave Konopka – art direction and design
Timothy Saccenti – photography

References

External links
 Official Battles website

2007 albums
Battles (band) albums
Warp (record label) albums